Zu Geng (祖庚), personal name Zi Yue, was king of the Shang dynasty of China.

His capital was at Yin (殷). Zu Geng is thought to have been the commissioner and dedicator of the Houmuwu ding, which he had cast in memory of his mother, Fu Jing.

He ruled for seven years from 1191, after the death of his father Wu Ding, and was succeeded by his brother Zu Jia.

References

Shang dynasty kings
12th-century BC Chinese monarchs